Glenn Foster "Slats" Hardin (July 1, 1910 – March 6, 1975) was an American athlete, winner of 400 m hurdles at the 1936 Summer Olympics.

Born in Derma, Mississippi, Glenn Hardin was the world's dominant 400 m hurdler in the 1930s and was equally tough in the 400 m flat race.

Hardin's rise began at the 1932 Summer Olympics, where he finished second in the 400 m hurdles in 52.0 but was given credit for a world record when the winner, Bob Tisdall from Ireland, knocked down a hurdle, an error that in those days disqualified a performance for world record consideration. Hardin lowered the record to 51.8 in the 1934 AAU championships and then bettered it to 50.6 during a meet in Stockholm later that year. That record would stand for the next nineteen years.

Hardin was unbeatable between the 1932 and 1936 Olympics, winning the AAU title in 1933, 1934 and 1936 in 400 m hurdles and NCAA championships title in 1933 and 1934 in  hurdles. Hardin finished his career at the Berlin Olympics, beating John Loaring from Canada by 0.3 seconds.

Hardin was a member of the LSU Tigers outdoor track and field team that won the school's first ever NCAA Championship in 1933.  He won two NCAA individual titles during the meet.

References

External links 
 
 
 

1910 births
1975 deaths
American male hurdlers
Athletes (track and field) at the 1932 Summer Olympics
Athletes (track and field) at the 1936 Summer Olympics
LSU Tigers track and field athletes
Louisiana State University alumni
World record setters in athletics (track and field)
People from Calhoun County, Mississippi
Track and field athletes from Mississippi
Medalists at the 1936 Summer Olympics
Medalists at the 1932 Summer Olympics
Olympic gold medalists for the United States in track and field
Olympic silver medalists for the United States in track and field